Cellana grata is a true limpet, that feeds on epilithic biofilm.

Description

Distribution
This species is found off  the coast from Japan to Vietnam.

References

 Hylleberg J, & Kilburn RN (2003) Marine molluscs of Vietnam: annotations, voucher material, and species in need of verification.  Phuket Marine Biological Center Special Publication, 28, 1–299.
 Nakano T. & Ozawa T. (2007). Worldwide phylogeography of limpets of the order Patellogastropoda: molecular, morphological and paleontological evidence. Journal of Molluscan Studies 73(1): 79–99
 Cellana grata (Gould, 1859). In: Bouchet, P.; Gofas, S.; Rosenberg, G. (2010) World Marine Mollusca database. Accessed through:  World Register of Marine Species at http://www.marinespecies.org/aphia.php?p=taxdetails&id=325450 on 16 June 2010

Nacellidae
Gastropods described in 1859